Nuhu Bature Achi (19?? – December 18, 2021) was the first monarch of Bajju Chiefdom, a Nigerian traditional state in southern Kaduna State, Nigeria. He was also known by the title, "A̠gwam Ba̠jju 1".

Bature became the first  monarch of the Bajju Chiefdom after its creation in 1995, following the Zangon Kataf crises of 1992 in which a resolution was reached and the creation of the long-agitated independent Chiefdom for the Atyap and Bajju from the British-imposed Zazzau Emirate was arrived at. In 2012, HRH Agwam Bature decreed that 17 years after the creation of the chiefdom, Ka̠jju (the land of the Bajju people) was yet to have a palace.

References

Year of birth missing (living people)
Living people
People from Kaduna State 
Nigerian traditional rulers 
African monarchs